Kitan Vasilev (born 19 February 1997) is a Bulgarian footballer who plays as a winger for Krumovgrad.

Career

Slavia Sofia
Vasilev started his career in Slavia Sofia. He made his professional debut on 17 May 2014 in a match against Pirin Gotse Delchev. For the 2016–17 season he was sent on loan to Vitosha Bistritsa for a season long deal and after a good first half of the season on 18 December 2016 his loan was ended and he returned to Slavia.
On 3 August 2017, he was loaned again to Vitosha Bistritsa.

On 16 January 2018 he switched his loan from Vitosha to Tsarsko Selo.

Career statistics

Club

References

External links

1997 births
Living people
Bulgarian footballers
Bulgaria youth international footballers
PFC Slavia Sofia players
FC Vitosha Bistritsa players
FC Tsarsko Selo Sofia players
FC Lokomotiv 1929 Sofia players
FC Septemvri Simitli players
FC Krumovgrad players
First Professional Football League (Bulgaria) players
Second Professional Football League (Bulgaria) players
Association football wingers
Sportspeople from Blagoevgrad